BMS-906024 is a drug with a benzodiazepine structure, developed by Bristol-Myers Squibb and disclosed at the spring 2013 American Chemical Society meeting in New Orleans to treat breast, lung, colon cancers and leukemia. The drug works as a pan-Notch inhibitor. The structure is one of a set patented in 2012, and is being studied in clinical trials.

References 

Benzodiazepines
Experimental cancer treatments